Sitting Pretty on Top of the World is the third studio album by American country music singer Lauren Alaina. It was released in September 2021 via Mercury Records Nashville.

Content
The album consists of fifteen songs, fourteen of which Alaina co-wrote. Two singles, "Getting Good" and the Jon Pardi duet "Getting Over Him", were released prior to the album. Both of these appeared on extended plays prior to the album's release; on Sitting Pretty on Top of the World, "Getting Good" was remixed as a duet with Trisha Yearwood. Paul DiGiovanni and David Garcia produced the album.

Critical reception
Stephen Thomas Erlewine of AllMusic rated the album three stars out of five, stating that "as a collection of individual tracks, Sitting Pretty on Top of the World hits its target squarely in the middle of the road: it's adult contemporary country where Alaina feels equally at home on the light pop tunes and melodramatic showstoppers."

Track listing

Personnel
Adapted from album's liner notes.

Musicians
Lauren Alaina – lead vocals (all tracks), background vocals (all tracks)
Dave Cohen – keyboards (track 3)
Paul DiGiovanni – acoustic guitar (track 9), electric guitar (tracks 2, 4, 6, 8, 9, 11, 14), keyboards (tracks 2, 4, 5, 8, 10-15), programming (all tracks except 3), background vocals (tracks 2, 5, 6, 8, 10, 15)
Jacob Durrett – programming (track 13)
Jeneé Fleenor – fiddle (track 9)
David Garcia – electric guitar (track 3), keyboards (track 3), programming (track 3)
Lukas Graham – duet vocals (track 7)
Ben Johnson – programming (track 9)
Hillary Lindsey – background vocals (tracks 1, 4, 8, 14)
Tony Lucido – bass guitar (tracks 6, 9)
Miles McPherson – drums (track 3)
Rob McNelley – electric guitar (track 3)
Jon Pardi – duet vocals (track 9)
Jordan Reynolds – programming (track 5)
Jimmie Lee Sloas – bass guitar (tracks 1-5, 8, 10-15)
Ernest K. Smith – background vocals (track 13)
Ilya Toshinsky – acoustic guitar (all tracks except 7)
Derek Wells – electric guitar (all tracks except 7)
Alex Wright – keyboards (all tracks except 3)
Trisha Yearwood – duet vocals (track 3)
Nir Z. – drums (all tracks except 3 & 7)

Proudction
Joel McKenney – assistant engineering (all tracks except 3)
Cary Barlowe – vocal recording (all tracks except 3)
Jim Cooley – engineering, mixing (all tracks except 3)
Adam Ayan – mastering (all tracks except 3)
Jeff Balding – engineering (track 3)
David Garcia – vocal recording (track 3)
Mark Endert – mixing (track 3)
Stephen Marcussen – mastering (track 3)

Imagery
Karen Naff – art direction
Wendy Stamberger – design
Katie Kauss – photography
Amber Cannon, Meri Fernandes – hair and makeup
Amber Lehman – wardrobe stylist
Kera Jackson – art production

Chart performance

References

2021 albums
Lauren Alaina albums
Mercury Records albums